Belenois welwitschii is a butterfly in the family Pieridae. It is found in Angola, the Democratic Republic of the Congo, Zambia, Malawi and Tanzania. The habitat consists of forests.

The larvae feed on Maerua and Cadaba species.

Subspecies
Belenois welwitschii welwitschii (north-eastern Angola, Democratic Republic of the Congo, Zambia, Malawi)
Belenois welwitschii shaba  Berger, 1981 (Democratic Republic of the Congo, western Tanzania, Zambia)

References

Seitz, A. Die Gross-Schmetterlinge der Erde 13: Die Afrikanischen Tagfalter. Plate XIII 12

Butterflies described in 1890
Pierini
Butterflies of Africa